The 1913 Spring Hill Badgers football team represented the Spring Hill College as an independent during the 1913 college football season. Maxon Field was moved to a new location

Schedule

References

Spring Hill
Spring Hill Badgers football seasons
Spring Hill Badgers football